Dalāil al-khayrāt wa-shawāriq al-anwār fī dhikr al-ṣalāt alá al-Nabī al-mukhtār, usually shortened to Dala'il al-Khayrat, is a famous collection of prayers for the Islamic prophet Muhammad, which was written by the Moroccan Shadhili scholar Muhammad al-Jazuli (died 1465 AD). It is popular in parts of the Islamic world amongst traditional Muslims—specifically North Africa, the Levant, Turkey, the Caucasus and South Asia—and is divided into sections for daily recitation.

Background
Moroccan hadith scholar Abdullah al-Talidi wrote of the Dala'il al-Khayrat: "Millions of Muslims from East to West tried it and found its good, its blessing, and its benefit for centuries and over generations, and witnessed its unbelievable spiritual blessings and light. Muslims avidly recited it, alone and in groups, in homes and mosques, utterly spending themselves in the Blessings on the Most Beloved and praising him".

The Dala'il al-Khayrat is the first major book in Islamic history which compiled litanies of peace and blessings upon Muhammad. It is also the most popular and most universally acclaimed collection of litanies asking God to bless him. Among some Sunni religious orders, most notably the Shadhili order, its recitation is a daily practice. In others however, its recitation is a purely voluntary daily practice. The work begins with the ninety nine names of God, and then the a collection of over one hundred names of Muhammad.

The legend behind the origin of the Dala'il al-Khayrat claims that al-Jazuli once awoke late for his morning prayers and began to look in vain for pure water to perform ritual ablutions. In the midst of his search al-Jazuli encountered a young girl who was aware of al-Jazuli's famed religiosity and was bewildered on why al-Jazuli could not find pure water. The girl then spat into a well which miraculously overflowed with pure sweet water for al-Jazuli to perform ablutions. Consequent to performing prayer, al-Jazuli inquired to the means by which the girl achieved such a high spiritual station. The girl replied it was simply by "Making constant prayer for God to bless the best of creation by the number of breaths and heartbeats." Al-Jazuli then resolved to write a work collecting litanies of prayers asking God to bless and show mercy and kindness to Muhammad.

Al-Jazuli then moved east to Medina where he would recite the whole of the Dala'il al-Khayrat twice daily at Muhammad's grave in al-Masjid an-Nabawi. The Dala'il Khayrat has since been seen as a testament of love and passionate longing for Muhammad.

Many of exegesis were written on the Dala'il Khayrat - most notably by the scholar Yusuf an-Nabhani in his work Afdal al-Salawat, Mohammed al-Mahdi al-Fasi's Matali‘ Al Masarrat Bi Jalaa’ Dala’il Al Khayrat (مطالع المسرات بجلاء دلائل الخيرات) and Abd al-Majid al-Sharnubi al-Azhari's Sharh Dala'il Khayrat. A classic Ottoman era work by Kara Davud is popular in Turkish, titled Tevfîk-i Muvaffık il-Hayrât li-Neyl'il-berekât fî Hidmet-i Menbâ'üs-sa'adât, in short known as "Kara Davud".

Manuscripts

Gallery

References

External links

Read/Download Dalail ul Khairat Shareef (Urdu)
Dala'il al-Khayrat (Audio).
English translation of Dala'il al-Khayrat
The Story of Dala’il al-Khayrat (by Sheikh Nuh Ha Mim Keller)
An Appreciation by Siddiq Osman Noormuhammad
Read online
Read online in Arabic with English translation and transliteration

Sunni literature
Sufi literature
Islamic prayer
15th century in Morocco
Marinid Sultanate
15th-century Arabic books